Sir Augustus Charles Gregory  (1 August 1819 – 25 June 1905) was an English-born Australian explorer and surveyor. Between 1846 and 1858 he undertook four major expeditions. He was the first Surveyor-General of Queensland. He was appointed a lifetime Member of the Queensland Legislative Council.

Early years
Augustus Charles Gregory was born at Farnsfield, Nottingham, England. He was the second of five brothers born to Joshua Gregory and Frances Churchman.  Among his brothers were Francis Thomas Gregory, who also became a noted explorer.

Joshua William Gregory, born 1815, died 20 September 1850 aged 35.
Augustus Charles Gregory, born 1 August 1819, died 1905 aged 86
Francis (Frank) Thomas Gregory, born 1821.
Henry Churcham Gregory, born 1823, died London 29 July 1903 aged 79 years
Charles Frederick Gregory, born 1825.

A. C. Gregory was educated privately by tutors and later by his mother. In 1829, the family emigrated to Western Australia on board the Lotus, arriving at the Swan River Colony only four months after its establishment.

The Gregory family were initially granted land on the left bank of the Swan River, but the soil was poor, and they later obtained two further grants, one at Maylands and another in the Upper Swan district.  For much of the 1830s, Augustus took jobs to supplement the family's income.  For a while he worked for a chemist, and later in partnership with his brother Joshua William as a contract surveyor.  In December 1841, he joined the Government Survey Office.

Explorations

In 1846, with his two brothers, F. T. Gregory and H. C. Gregory, he made his first exploration. With four horses and seven weeks' provisions they left T. N. Yule's station 60 miles northeast of Perth on 7 August 1846 and explored a considerable amount of the country to the north of Perth, returning after an absence of 47 days during which they had covered 953 miles (1534 km).

Two years later, Gregory led an expedition to examine the course of the Gascoyne River and, in particular, to look for new pasture-land. The party left on 2 September 1848, crossing the Murchison River 25 September, but the country was very dry and it became difficult to water the horses. Gregory decided to turn south again in the beginning of October, and on 6 October decided to rest the horses by the Murchison River. The party returned to Perth on 12 November after having found good pastures. Despite water supply difficulties, about 1500 miles (2414 km) were covered in a period of 10 weeks.

In 1854 while Assistant Surveyor of Western Australia, Gregory was asked to lead an expedition to the interior, from a rendezvous point at Moreton Bay near Brisbane. Gregory had his brother, H. C. Gregory, as second in command and Baron von Mueller as botanist. There were 19 men altogether, with 50 horses and 200 sheep. The party left Moreton Bay by sea on 12 August 1855, and Port Essington was sighted on 1 September. On the next day their vessel grounded on a reef and it was impossible to float off until 10 September. They proceeded to Pearce Point (Joseph Bonaparte Gulf), and at the end of the month the party reached the estuary of the Victoria River. The party split up, with one group going up the river in a schooner, while Gregory led the other over the range. It was on this trip that Gregory made contact with the Gurindji people, with his party their first ever contact with Europeans. 

Gregory had secured the services of John Gilburri Fahy. Gilburri had recently been captured after living thirteen years with the Bunya Mountains aborigines. Gregory made a deal with Fahy to act as bush guide for the mission and lead him to the last known place of missing explorer Ludwig Leichhardt.  Gregory promised Fahy would receive a full pardon which he did so in 1857.

They were reunited on 20 October, establishing a camp 20 km west of today's Timber Creek. Gregory led several forays up the Victoria River and traced Sturt's Creek for 300 miles (483 km) until it disappeared in the Tanami Desert. The core team returned to the base camp in the dry season of 1856. On 2 July 1856 Gregory left an inscription on a large boab tree (so-called Gregory's Tree), indicating where he left a letter in case the expedition team should get lost. Turning east, the party explored the Elsey, Roper and Macarthur Rivers, then travelled back to Brisbane by way of the Flinders, Burdekin, Fitzroy and Burnett Rivers.  They reached Brisbane on 16 December 1856 having surveyed an extensive swath of land. In sixteen months the expedition had journeyed over 2000 miles (3219 km) by sea and 5000 (8047 km) by land.

In September 1857 Gregory was hired by the government of New South Wales to search for traces of Ludwig Leichhardt, a fellow explorer who had disappeared on an earlier expedition. A party of nine was formed with Gregory in command and his brother, C. F. Gregory, as second in command. On 24 March 1858 the expedition left Juandah near the present town of Taroom.  On 21 April a tree marked with an L was found in latitude 24 degrees 35 minutes and longitude 146 degrees 6 minutes. The Barcoo River was then followed to its junction with the Thomson. On 15 May the country was so dry the expedition turned south to save the horses. Cooper Creek was followed until it was close to the South Australian border, coming to Strzelecki Creek on 14 June. Continuing his course mostly to the south, on 26 June he decided to proceed to Adelaide, which was reached at the end of July 1858.

Later life

In 1855 Gregory became a freemason in the Sydney Samaritan Lodge in New South Wales.

Gregory was awarded the Founder's Medal of the Royal Geographical Society in 1858.

Gregory undertook no further explorations but was appointed Surveyor General of Queensland in 1859. He later clashed with William Alcock Tully (then under-secretary for public lands and chief commissioner of crown lands); in 1875 Tully became acting surveyor-general in place of Gregory. Gregory then became a geological surveyor.

In 1862, he built by hand the now heritage-listed farmhouse Rainworth at Rosalie in Brisbane. He lived there until his death. He leased a home he had built on the Rainworth estate to surveying colleague, Walter C. Hume, which he and his family re-named "Fairseat".

On 23 December 1862, Gregory was appointed Provincial Grand Master of the England masonic Lodge in Queensland.

In 1865 Gregory, Maurice Charles O’Connell and John Douglas applied for a special grant of land to erect a Masonic Hall in Brisbane. This was granted on 15 January 1865. On 28 February 1865 Gregory was made a Royal Arch Mason in the North Australia Royal Arch Chapter.

From 1880 to his death in 1905, he served as a councillor of the Shire of Toowong and as an alderman of its successor, the Town of Toowong. He was shire president for 12 years, being 1881 to 1884, 1888 to 1890, 1895, 1898 to 1901 and town mayor in 1904.

On 10 November 1882 Gregory was made a member of the Queensland Legislative Council (a lifetime appointment).

By the late 1880s he had built a summer house in Southport.

With his brother, F. T. Gregory, he published their Journals of Australian Exploration in 1884.

He was interested in scientific research and was a trustee of the Queensland Museum.

Early in 1895, Gregory was appointed Grand Superintendent of Royal Arch Masonry in Queensland. On 25 June 1895 he opened the District Grand Chapter.

On 6 November 1903, Gregory was knighted, being appointed Knight Commander of the Order of St Michael and St George (Imperial) in recognition of his service as Surveyor-General and in the Queensland Legislative Council.

Gregory died on 25 June 1905 at his residence Rainworth at Rosalie, Brisbane. His body lay in state at the Masonic Hall in Alice Street where many people came to pay their respects; it was estimated that 1,400 people visited on the morning of the funeral. His funeral took place at the hall in the afternoon of 29 June 1905, after which a funeral procession of several hundred people walked along Alice Street, William Street, North Quay and the River Road (now Coronation Drive) to the Toowong Cemetery where hundreds of people were already assembled at the cemetery. Gregory was buried high on the northern slope of the hill below Governor Samuel Blackall's grave with Anglican rites conducted by his friend Rev. Thomas Jones of Indooroopilly.

After his death, his home Rainworth was rented to a number of people, including Robert Philp. His farm land was eventually subdivided and, to facilitate this, the house Rainworth was relocated to another site, now 7 Barton Street in the suburb of Bardon. The house was added to the Queensland Heritage Register on 21 October 1992.

In late 1905 Brisbane artist Oscar Fristrom sculpted a bust of Gregory. In February 1906, Fristrom offered to sell the bust to the Royal Geographical Society of Queensland but the society decided not to buy it; however, they did display it at an event in June 1906. For many years the bust was displayed at Freemasons’ Gregory Lodge in Cairns (Gregory being depicted wearing his Masonic regalia). In 2018, the Freemasons donated the bust to the Museum of Lands, Mapping and Surveying in Brisbane. As at 10 March 2020, the bust is at the entrance of the museum.

Recognition and legacy 
Gregory has been honoured through the naming of many places in Australia, including: 
 Electoral district of Gregory, Queensland
 Gregory, Queensland, a town
 Gregory, Western Australia, a town
 Gregory Highway, Queensland
 Gregory National Park, Northern Territory
 Gregory River in the Shire of Burke, Queensland
 Mount Augustus
Mount Augustus National Park, Western Australia

Several plants were named in his honour, including:
 Adansonia gregorii, known as the boab tree
Gregory's Tree, a boab inscribed by Gregory's party in 1856
 Brachychiton gregorii, known as the desert kurrajong
 Cochlospermum gregorii, a type of native kapok tree

The road name "Gregory Gardens" in his birthplace Farnsfield, Nottinghamshire, England was named after him.

His home Rainworth was the origin of the name of  Rainworth, Queensland, a suburb (now locality) in Brisbane.

See also

European exploration of Australia
List of explorers
Gilburri

References

Further reading

External links

 
 

Australian explorers
Explorers of Australia
Explorers of Western Australia
1819 births
1905 deaths
Australian geologists
Members of the Queensland Legislative Council
Burials at Toowong Cemetery
Australian Knights Commander of the Order of St Michael and St George
Australian surveyors
People from Newark and Sherwood (district)
Surveyors General of Queensland
Royal Society of Queensland
English emigrants to Australia
Settlers of Western Australia
19th-century Australian politicians
Fellows of the Royal Scottish Geographical Society